2007 The National was held March 22–25, 2007, at Port Hawkesbury, Nova Scotia. The total purse of the event was $100,000.

Kevin Martin defeated Kevin Koe in an all-Edmonton final. It was Martin's second victory in this Grand Slam event, the first with his new team.

Teams

Draw

Tie breakers
Adams 4–3 Ulsrud
Brewster 7–2 Johnson

Playoffs

Notes

External links

The National (March), 2007
The National (curling)
2007 in Nova Scotia
Inverness County, Nova Scotia
Curling competitions in Nova Scotia
March 2007 sports events in Canada